The first season of Witches of East End premiered on October 6, 2013, and concluded on December 15, 2013. It consisted of 10 episodes, each running 40–45 minutes approx. The series is based loosely on the book of the same name by Melissa de la Cruz. The story takes place in East End focusing on a family of witches, led by Joanna Beauchamp (Julia Ormond). This season aired on Sundays at 10pm, following the fifth season of Drop Dead Diva, and averaged 1.67 million viewers.

Cast and characters

Main cast
 Julia Ormond as Joanna Beauchamp
 Mädchen Amick as Wendy Beauchamp (Guest in episode 1, starring from episode 2 onwards)
 Jenna Dewan Tatum as Freya Beauchamp
 Rachel Boston as Ingrid Beauchamp
 Daniel Di Tomasso as Killian Gardiner
 Eric Winter as Dash Gardiner

Recurring cast
 Virginia Madsen as Penelope Gardiner / Athena Browning (8 episodes)
 Jason George as Adam Noble (5 episodes)
 Tiya Sircar as Amy Matthews (4 episodes)
 Enver Gjokaj as Mike (4 episodes)
 Anthony Lemke as Harrison Welles (3 episodes)
 Tom Lenk as Hudson Rafferty (3 episodes)
Gillian Barber as Maura Thatcher (3 episodes)
 Kellee Stewart as Barb (3 episodes)

Guest cast
 Neil Hopkins as Doug (2 episodes)
 Matt Frewer as Vidar (2 episodes)
 Freddie Prinze Jr. as Leo Wingate (2 episodes)
 Joel Gretsch as Victor (2 episodes)
 Kaitlin Doubleday as Elyse (1 episode)
 Matthew Del Negro as Archibald Browning (1 episode)

Episodes 
{| class="wikitable plainrowheaders" style="width:100%;"
|-
! scope="col" style="background:#8893C4; "| No. inseries
! scope="col" style="background:#8893C4; "| No. inseason
! scope="col" style="background:#8893C4; "| Title
! scope="col" style="background:#8893C4; "| Directed by
! scope="col" style="background:#8893C4; "| Written by
! scope="col" style="background:#8893C4; "| Original air date
! scope="col" style="background:#8893C4; "| Productioncode
! scope="col" style="background:#8893C4; "| U.S. viewers(million)
|-

|}

Ratings

U.S. ratings

U.K. ratings

All ratings are taken from the UK source of television figures, BARB.

References

Fiction set in 1906
2013 American television seasons
Witches of East End